Hitbox may refer to:
Hitbox, virtual collision detection tool
Hitbox (web analytics), web analytics software
Hitbox.tv, defunct video streaming service